Kamangar Kola may refer to:
 Kamangar Kola, Amol
 Kamangar Kola, Dabudasht, Amol County
 Kamangar Kola, Qaem Shahr